Ashta may refer to:

 Ashta: Middle Eastern dairy product

Geography 
Ashta, Madhya Pradesh may refer to:
Ashta, Bangladesh
Ashta, Madhya Pradesh, a municipality in Sehore district in the state of Madhya Pradesh, India
Ashta, Maharashtra, a city in Sangli district in the state of Maharashtra, India
 Ashta (Vidhan Sabha constituency), Madhya Pradesh
 Ashta HN Village of Beed District, Maharashtra State, India